Seaboard Coast Line Railroad station may refer to:

Seaboard Coast Line Railroad station (St. Petersburg, Florida), a historic former train station in St. Petersburg, Florida
Seaboard Coast Line Railroad Depot (Headland, Alabama), a historic former train station in Headland, Alabama
Naples Seaboard Air Line Railway Station, or Seaboard Coast Line Railroad Depot, a historic former train station in Naples, Florida
St. Petersburg station (Amtrak), or Seaboard Coast Line Railroad station, a former train station in St. Petersburg, Florida
Sanford station (SunRail), formerly the Seaboard Coast Line Railroad station, a train station in Sanford, Florida
West Palm Beach station, formerly the Seaboard Coast Line Railroad station, a train station in West Palm Beach, Florida